Moulin Rouge is an American pre-Code musical film released on January 19, 1934, by United Artists, starring Constance Bennett and Franchot Tone. It contained the songs "Coffee in the Morning and Kisses in the Night", and "Boulevard of Broken Dreams" with music by Harry Warren and lyrics by Al Dubin. Lucille Ball appears in an uncredited role as a show girl in the film. It has no relation to any other films of/with the same name. The cast also includes Tullio Carminati, Helen Westley, Russ Brown, Hobart Cavanaugh and Georges Renavent.

The film was Twentieth Century Pictures' fourth most popular movie of the year.

Plot
A singer marries a famous composer, and after a while she gets the itch to go back on the stage. However, her husband won't let her. When she hears that a popular French singer named "Raquel" is coming to New York, she decides to go to Raquel with a plan—unbeknownst to her husband, "Raquel" is actually her sister, and her plan is for them to switch places so she can fulfill her dream of going back on the stage. However, things don't go quite as planned.

Cast
 Constance Bennett as Helen Hall
 Franchot Tone as Douglas Hall
 Tullio Carminati as Le Maire
 Helen Westley as Mrs. Morris
 Russ Columbo as himself
 The Boswell Sisters as Themselves

Soundtrack
 "The Boulevard of Broken Dreams"
Music by Harry Warren 
Lyrics by Al Dubin 
Performed by Constance Bennett in rehearsal 
Reprised by Constance Bennett and chorus in the show finale 
 "Coffee in the Morning and Kisses in the Night"
Music by Harry Warren 
Lyrics by Al Dubin 
Sung by Constance Bennett at audition 
Reprised by Constance Bennett with Russ Columbo and also The Boswell Sisters in the show finale 
 "Song of Surrender" 
Music by Harry Warren 
Lyrics by Al Dubin 
Sung by Tullio Carminati while playing the piano

References

External links
 

1934 films
1930s English-language films
American black-and-white films
American musical comedy films
1934 musical comedy films
Films produced by Darryl F. Zanuck
Films with screenplays by Nunnally Johnson
Films directed by Sidney Lanfield
Films scored by Alfred Newman
Twentieth Century Pictures films
United Artists films
1930s American films